Charles Madison Curry (1869–1944) was an English literature professor and an author and reviewer of children's literature in the late 19th century and early 20th century. He was a Professor of English and Literature at Indiana State Normal School (now Indiana State University) and authored the school's Alma Mater in 1925. He edited Literary Readings: An Introduction to the Study of Literature (1903). He created with Martha Adelaide Holton, the Holton-Curry Reader, a basal reader in 8 volumes for the elementary grades, which was published by Rand McNally in 1914.

References

External links 
 Online Books by Charles Madison Curry

19th-century American non-fiction writers
20th-century American non-fiction writers

1869 births
1944 deaths